Bruno Agustin Amione (born 3 January 2002) is an Argentine professional footballer who plays as a centre-back for  club Sampdoria, on loan from Hellas Verona.

Amione was included in The Guardian's "Next Generation 2019".

Club career 
On 2 October 2020, he signed for Serie A club Hellas Verona. Amione made his debut on 25 November, as a 79th-minute substitute in a 3–3 Coppa Italia draw to Venezia, which Hellas Verona won on penalties.

On 30 August 2021, he joined Reggina on loan. Upon his return from loan to Verona, Amione made his Serie A debut in their season opener against Napoli on 15 August 2022.

On 1 September 2022, Amione moved on a season-long loan to Sampdoria.

Style of play
Mainly a centre-back, Amione can also play as a left-back.

Career statistics

Club

References

2002 births
Living people
Argentine footballers
Argentine expatriate footballers
Association football defenders
Club Atlético Belgrano footballers
Hellas Verona F.C. players
Reggina 1914 players
U.C. Sampdoria players
Primera Nacional players
Serie B players
Serie A players
Argentine expatriate sportspeople in Italy
Expatriate footballers in Italy
Argentina youth international footballers